Parliamentary elections were held in Austria on 13 May 1956. The result was a victory for the Austrian People's Party, which won 82 of the 165 seats in the National Council. Voter turnout was 96%.  Although the ÖVP had come up one seat short of an absolute majority, ÖVP leader and Chancellor Julius Raab retained the grand coalition with the Socialists, with the SPÖ leader Adolf Schärf as Vice-Chancellor.

Results

References

Elections in Austria
Legislative
Austria
Austria